The 2007 Spanish Formula Three Championship was the seventh Spanish Formula Three Championship season. It commenced on March 31, 2007 and ended on November 11 after sixteen races, with Spanish driver Máximo Cortés crowned champion.

Teams and drivers

 All cars are powered by Fiat engines and Dunlop tyres. Main class powered by Dallara F306, while Copa Class by Dallara F300 chassis. Guest drivers in italics.
{|
|

Calendar

Standings

Class A
Points are awarded as follows:

 The starting grid of the second race will be based on the obtained results of the first race, but the order of the first six classified may be changed, their positions will be permuted.

Copa F300

Points are awarded for both races as follows:

Team Standings

References

External links
 Official Site

Formula Three season
Euroformula Open Championship seasons
Spain
Spanish F3